Howard Mill (also, Howard Mill Station) is a former settlement in Lake County, California. Howard Mill still appeared on maps as of 1951.

References

Former settlements in Lake County, California
Former populated places in California